World Championship Wrestling had held a variety of professional wrestling tournaments competed for by wrestlers that were a part of their roster.

Sporadic tournaments
Pin-Pinfall; Sub-Submission; CO-Countout; DCO-Double countout; DQ-Disqualification; DDQ-Double Disqualification Ref-Referee's decision; NC-No Contest

Bunkhouse Stampede Tournament

Jim Crockett, Sr. Memorial Cup Tag Team Tournament

NWA United States Championship Tournament (1975)
The NWA United States Championship Tournament was a tournament that took place on November 9, 1975, and was created to crown a new United States Champion after Johnny Valentine suffered a career ending back injury.

NWA United States Championship Tournament (1979)
The NWA United States Championship Tournament was a tournament that took place on September 1, 1979, to crown a new United States Champion after Ric Flair vacated the championship due to winning the NWA World Tag Team Championship four days earlier.

NWA United States Championship Tournament (1981)
The NWA United States Championship Tournament was a tournament to crown the new United States Champion after Wahoo McDaniel vacated the title due to injury.

NWA United States Championship Tournament (1984)
The NWA United States Championship Tournament was a tournament to crown the new United States Champion after Wahoo McDaniel was forced to vacate the title due to his controversial title win over Ricky Steamboat, which took place due to outside interference by Tully Blanchard.

NWA World Television Championship Tournament (1986)
The NWA World Television Championship Tournament was a tournament held on January 4, 1986, to crown a new World Television Champion after Dusty Rhodes was stripped of the title due to injury at the hands of Ric Flair and The Minnesota Wrecking Crew.

Jim Crockett, Sr. Memorial Cup Tag Team Tournament (1986)

The Jim Crockett, Sr. Memorial Cup Tag Team Tournament was a tournament held on April 19, 1986, at The Superdome in New Orleans, Louisiana and had an afternoon & night show.

Jim Crockett, Sr. Memorial Cup Tag Team Tournament (1987)

The Jim Crockett, Sr. Memorial Cup Tag Team Tournament was a tournament that ran from April 9 to April 10, 1987, with both shows at The Baltimore Arena in Baltimore, Maryland.

Jim Crockett, Sr. Memorial Cup Tag Team Tournament (1988)

The Jim Crockett, Sr. Memorial Cup Tag Team Tournament was a tournament.

NWA United States Tag Team Championship Tournament (1988)
The NWA United States Tag Team Championship Tournament was a tournament to crown the new United States Tag Team Champions after the titles were vacated when The Midnight Express won the NWA World Tag Team Championship on September 10, 1988.

Notes:
1

NWA World Tag Team Championship Tournament (1989)
The NWA World Tag Team Championship Tournament was a tournament to crown the new World Tag Team Champions after Mike Rotunda and Steve Williams were forced to vacate the titles due to their Varsity Club teammates attacking special guest referee Nikita Koloff during their title defense against Road Warriors at WrestleWar.

Notes:
1

Iron Man Tournaments (1989)
The Iron Man and Iron Team tournaments were round-robin tournaments featuring four competing individuals and tag teams respectively. The point system: 20 points for a pinfall or submission victory, 15 for a countout victory, 10 for a disqualification victory, 5 for a time-limit draw and 0 for a loss.

Iron Man tournament

Iron Team tournament

NWA United States Tag Team Championship Tournament (1990)
The NWA United States Tag Team Championship Tournament was a tournament to crown the new United States Tag Team Champions after Eddie Gilbert and Rick Steiner vacated the titles due to Steiner splitting from Gilbert to form a tag team with his brother Scott.

Running the Gauntlet Tournament (1990)
The Running the Gauntlet Tournament was a tournament.

September 14–16, 1990 
Brian Pillman defeated Tim Horner and Buddy Landel, before losing to Dan Spivey.

September 21–23, 1990 
Scott Steiner defeated Bobby Eaton, Ric Flair, and Arn Anderson to run the gauntlet.

September 28–30, 1990
Bobby Eaton defeated Tracey Smothers and Ricky Morton, before losing to Sid Eudy.

November 11–13, 1990
Steve Armstrong defeated Stan Lane, but lost to his second opponent Buddy Landel. Had Armstrong defeated Landel, he would've wrestled Bobby Eaton.

November 17–19, 1990
Rick Steiner defeated Moondog Rex, Sid Vicious and Ric Flair to run the gauntlet.

November 23–25, 1990
Ric Flair defeated Buddy Landel, but lost to his second opponent Ron Simmons. Had Flair defeated Simmons, he would've wrestled The Nightstalker.

Pat O'Connor Memorial International Tag Team Tournament (1990)

The Pat O'Connor Memorial International Tag Team Tournament was a tournament at Starrcade.

WCW World Tag Team Championship Tournament (1991)
The WCW World Tag Team Championship Tournament was a tournament to crown the new World Tag Team Champions after Steiner Brothers vacated the titles due to Scott Steiner suffering an injury.

 The Executioner replaced Black Blood

WCW United States Championship Tournament (1991)
The WCW United States Championship Tournament was a tournament to crown the new United States Champion after Lex Luger vacated the title upon winning the WCW World Heavyweight Championship at The Great American Bash.

WCW Light Heavyweight Championship Tournament

The WCW Light Heavyweight Championship Tournament was a tournament held in 1991 to crown the first-ever Light Heavyweight Champion. The finals took place at Halloween Havoc, where Brian Pillman defeated Richard Morton to become the inaugural champion.

NWA World Tag Team Championship Tournament (1992)

The NWA World Tag Team Championship Tournament was a tournament to crown the first-ever NWA World Tag Team Champions. The tournament took place at The Great American Bash on July 12, 1992.

Nintendo Top Ten Challenge Tournament (1992)
The Nintendo Top Ten Challenge Tournament was a tournament.

King of Cable Tournament

The King of Cable Tournament was a single-elimination tournament in 1992. The finals were held at Starrcade.

Jesse Ventura Invitational Strongest Arm arm wrestling tournament (1992)
The Jesse Ventura Invitational Strongest Arm Tournament was a 1992 arm wrestling tournament held on WCW WorldWide to determine which wrestler on the roster was the best. The competitors were (kayfabe) selected by WCW color analyst Jesse Ventura.

WCW World Television Championship Tournament (1993)
The WCW World Television Championship Tournament was a tournament to crown the new World Television Champion after Scott Steiner was stripped of the title due to leaving WCW.

WCW United States Championship Tournament (1993)
The WCW United States Championship Tournament was a tournament that ran from December 14, 1992, to January 11, 1993. This was initially a #1 contenders tournament for Rick Rude's United States Heavyweight Championship, but when Rude became injured, he was stripped of the title, thus the final between Ricky Steamboat and Dustin Rhodes was for the championship.

European Cup Tournament (1994)
The European Cup Tournament was a tournament that took place from March 3 to March 20, 1994.

WCW United States Championship Tournament (1995)

The WCW United States Championship Tournament was a tournament to crown the new United States Heavyweight Champion after Vader was stripped of the title due to injuring Dave Sullivan.

Slim Jim Challenge (1995)
The Slim Jim Challenge was a tournament.

Lord Of The Ring Tournament (1996)
The Lord Of The Ring Tournament was a tournament from Slamboree 1996, where teams were randomly selected through lottery, which every team that won their respective matches, would win a spot at the Lord Of The Ring Battle Royal later on that night.

WCW United States Championship Tournament (1996)

The WCW United States Championship Tournament was a tournament to crown the new United States Heavyweight Champion after Ric Flair vacated the title due to shoulder injury.

WCW Women's Championship Tournament (1996)

The WCW Women's Championship Tournament was a tournament to determine the first-ever Women's Champion, with the finals taking place at Starrcade.

WCW Women's Cruiserweight Championship Tournament (1997)

The WCW Women's Cruiserweight Championship Tournament was a tournament to crown the first-ever Women's Cruiserweight Champion.

WCW United States Championship Tournament (1999)
The WCW United States Championship Tournament was a tournament to crown the new United States Heavyweight Champion after Scott Hall was stripped of the title by Ric Flair.

 After Jericho was eliminated by Steiner, he was able to negotiate his way back in.

WCW World Heavyweight Championship Tournament (1999)

The WCW World Heavyweight Championship Tournament was a tournament to crown the new World Heavyweight Champion after Sting was stripped of the title due to attacking a referee at Halloween Havoc. The tournament finals took place at Mayhem.

WCW World Tag Team Championship Tournament (January 2000)
The WCW World Tag Team Championship Tournament was a tournament to crown the new World Tag Team Champions after The Outsiders vacated the title due to Scott Hall suffering an injury.

Scott Steiner became Kevin Nash's partner in the second round.

Vampiro replaced Kanyon in the third round.

WCW Cruiserweight Championship Tournament (2000)

The WCW Cruiserweight Championship Tournament was a tournament for the vacated Cruiserweight Championship, which took place after Oklahoma was forced to vacate the title due to exceeding the weight limit of a cruiserweight.

WCW World Heavyweight Championship Tournament (2000)

The WCW World Heavyweight Championship Tournament was a tournament to crown the new World Heavyweight Champion after Eric Bischoff and Vince Russo vacated all the titles.

WCW United States Championship Tournament (April 2000)

The WCW United States Championship Tournament was a tournament to crown the new United States Heavyweight Champion after Eric Bischoff and Vince Russo vacated all the titles. The tournament took place at Spring Stampede.

WCW World Tag Team Championship Tournament (April 2000) 

The WCW World Tag Team Championship Tournament was a tournament to crown the new World Tag Team Champions after Eric Bischoff and Vince Russo vacated all the titles. The tournament took place at Spring Stampede.

WCW United States Championship Tournament (July 2000)
The WCW United States Championship Tournament was a tournament that took place on July 18, 2000, for the vacated United States Championship after Scott Steiner was stripped of the title due to using his banned Steiner Recliner on Mike Awesome during a match at Bash at the Beach.

London Lethal Lottery Tag Team Tournament (2000)
The London Lethal Lottery Tag Team Tournament was a tournament.

WCW Hardcore Championship Tournament (2000)
The WCW Hardcore Championship Tournament was a tournament to crown the new Hardcore Champion after Mike Sanders stripped Norman Smiley of the title.

 Sgt. AWOL originally defeated Reno in the finals but WCW Commissioner Mike Sanders reversed the decision and awarded the win to Reno.

European Cup Tournament (2000)

The European Cup Tournament was a tournament.

WCW Cruiserweight Tag Team Championship Tournament (2001)

The WCW Cruiserweight Tag Team Championship Tournament was a tournament to crown the inaugural Cruiserweight Tag Team Champions.

See also
Professional wrestling tournament

References

Tournaments
Professional wrestling tournaments
Professional wrestling-related lists